Offspring is an Australian thriller about Rosa Cassini, a woman (Chantal Contouri) who becomes obsessed with her daughter Maria (Gabrielle Fitzpatrick) and her daughter's new found love Ben King (Robert Mammone). For her part Maria is unwilling to rekindle her relationship with her mother following an abusive past. Rosa however holds other dark secrets and a surprise for Maria and Ben.

References

External links

Australian thriller films
1996 films
1996 thriller films
1990s English-language films
1990s Australian films